Puck may refer to:

Objects
 Hockey puck, either an open or closed disk used in ice hockey and floor hockey serving the same function a ball does in ball games.
 Floor hockey puck, a disk, either open or closed, made from synthetic materials and designed for use on dry floors serving the same function a ball does in ball games
 Puck, a graphics tablet accessory
 Puck, the coffee grounds inside an espresso machine portafilter
 Puck, an injection-molded carrier that stabilizes products on a conveyor line
 Shaving soap, typically refers to a hard soap that is whipped into a lather using a shaving brush
 Puck or sometimes "puck adapter" an adapter put in the large hole of a 45 rpm single so that it could be played on the thinner type of spindle.

Characters
 Puck (folklore), a trickster character of folk tales
 Puck (A Midsummer Night's Dream), a character from Shakespeare's A Midsummer Night's Dream
 Puck, from the Faeries CBS TV special
 Puck, from the Gargoyles animated series
 Puck, the eponymous character from Rudyard Kipling's book Puck of Pook's Hill and its sequel
 Puck, from The Sandman series of comic books
 Puck, from The Sisters Grimm series of novels
 Puck (Marvel Comics), the codename of two Marvel characters
 Puck (Glee), from the musical comedy-drama Glee
 Puck (Love Birds), youngest penguin from the musical Love Birds
 Peter Puck, a hockey-puck-shaped cartoon character
 Puck, a character from the Berserk  manga and anime series
 Puck (Re:Zero), a character in the light novel series Re:Zero − Starting Life in Another World
 Puck, a non-playable character in the video game, Final Fantasy IX
 Puck, a playable character in the video game, Dota 2
 Baron Puck, in the 1867 opéra bouffe La Grande-Duchesse de Gérolstein

Literature
 Puck (magazine), an 1871–1918 humor publication
 Puck (literary magazine), a 1990s publication
 Puck, a novel by Ouida

Places
 Puck County, Poland
 Puck, Poland, a town and the county seat
 Gmina Puck, a gmina or administrative division
 Puck railway station
 Puck (moon), a moon of Uranus
 Bay of Puck, in the Baltic Sea

Other uses
 Puck (name), including a list of people with the name
 Puck (opera), an opéra-féerique which premiered in 1949
 Puck Building, a Manhattan landmark
 Puck Fair, an Irish festival
 Puck App, a mobile application that allows hockey players to quickly find and rent a hockey goalie
 Puck puzzle, a combination puzzle invented in 1980 by Hungarian physicist András Végh
 Puck Man, the original name for the arcade game Pac-Man
 Puck (fish), a genus of dreamer deep-water fish
 Puck (media company), American digital media company